Doc Hudspeth Redman (born December 27, 1997) is an American professional golfer.

High school career
Redman was born in Raleigh, North Carolina. He attended Leesville Road High School where he was the North Carolina AAAA state champion as a senior and all-state four years in high school.

College career
Competing for the Clemson Tigers, where he studied actuarial math. Redman won both the Jackrabbit and the Ka'anapali Classic in the fall of his freshman year.

Amateur career
Redman won the 2017 U.S. Amateur, after finishing 62nd out of 64 in the stroke play qualifier. He was also runner-up at the 2017 Western Amateur, losing in a playoff.

Redman competed in the 2017 Walker Cup.

Professional career
Redman turned professional following the 2018 NCAA Golf Championship and made his professional debut at the Memorial Tournament. By turning pro, he forfeited his exemptions into the 2018 U.S. Open and 2018 Open Championship which he earned via his U.S. Amateur win.

In June 2019, Redman shot a 62 to Monday qualify for the Rocket Mortgage Classic. In the tournament, he shot 68-67-67-67 and finished solo second to Nate Lashley, who ironically got into the field as an alternate after failing to secure his spot through the same qualifier. This earned him $788,400, entry into the 2019 Open Championship and Special Temporary Membership on the PGA Tour for the rest of the season, after starting 2019 on the third-tier Mackenzie Tour. Although he played in only six PGA events during the 2018–19 season, the 400 points he earned as a nonmember were just enough to surpass the 376 points needed to qualify for PGA Tour membership in the 2019–20 season. In 2020, he qualified for the FedExCup Playoffs, where he ranked number 71, just missing the BMW Championship. In 2021, Redman tied for third in the Safeway Open. At the Palmetto Championship, he finished in a six-way tie for second.

Amateur wins
2013 Carolinas Junior
2016 The Jackrabbit, Ka'anapali Collegiate Classic
2017 U.S. Amateur

Source:

Results in major championships
Results not in chronological order before 2019 and in 2020.

CUT = missed the half-way cut
"T" = tied
NT = No tournament due to COVID-19 pandemic

Results in The Players Championship

CUT = missed the halfway cut
"T" indicates a tie for a place

U.S. national team appearances
Amateur
Walker Cup: 2017 (winners)

References

External links
 
 

American male golfers
Clemson Tigers men's golfers
Golfers from Raleigh, North Carolina
1997 births
Living people